Leicester West is a constituency represented in the House of Commons of the UK Parliament since 2010 by Liz Kendall of the Labour Party. Along with the other two Leicester seats, it was held by Labour at the 2017 general election. Since its creation in 1918 the seat has sided with parties from the left wing of politics.

Boundaries 

1918–1950: The County Borough of Leicester wards of Abbey, Newton, St Margaret's, Westcotes, and Wyggeston.

1974–1983: The County Borough of Leicester wards of Abbey, Newton, North Braunstone, St Margaret's, and Westcotes.

1983–2010: The City of Leicester wards of Abbey, Beaumont Leys, Mowmacre, New Parks, North Braunstone, Rowley Fields, St Augustine's, Westcotes, and Western Park.

2010–present: The City of Leicester wards of Abbey, Beaumont Leys, Braunstone Park and Rowley Fields, Fosse, New Parks, Westcotes, and Western Park.

Constituency profile 
Leicester West is the whitest of the three Leicester constituencies, and the one with the highest proportion of social housing. Some areas of the seat, such as Braunstone and Beaumont Leys, are made up of large local authority estates, and around 30% of the housing is council- or housing association-owned, the second-highest in the Midlands. The centre of the seat, the Westcotes area, is more inner-city in character and is popular with young professionals and students.

Historically this used to be the safest Labour seat in Leicester—in the 1983 general election it was the only one to remain in Labour hands. However, the high Asian populations in Leicester South and Leicester East have pushed them away from the Conservative Party; while Leicester West is still a safe Labour seat, represented by that party since the Second World War, it is the most marginal of the three Leicester seats. While it did, like the other two Leicester seats, see a significant swing to Labour in 2017, unlike the other two seats Liz Kendall's majority was not a record high for the constituency.

As of 2009, in the depths of the late-2000s recession, the constituency had the fourth-highest level of unemployment in Britain, with 13.8% of residents registered unemployed. Most of the unemployment is concentrated in areas such as Braunstone, which is traditionally one of the most deprived parts of the city.

History 
In 1950, the seat was replaced by the constituencies of Leicester North West and Leicester South West, until 1974. In that period, Leicester North West was represented by Barnett Janner until 1970, and then by his son Greville Janner.

Members of Parliament

Elections

Elections in the 2010s

Elections in the 2000s

Elections in the 1990s

Elections in the 1980s

Elections in the 1970s

Election in the 1940s

Elections in the 1930s

Elections in the 1920s

Election in the 1910s

See also 
 List of parliamentary constituencies in Leicestershire and Rutland

Notes

References

Parliamentary constituencies in Leicestershire
Constituencies of the Parliament of the United Kingdom established in 1918
Constituencies of the Parliament of the United Kingdom disestablished in 1950
Constituencies of the Parliament of the United Kingdom established in 1974
Politics of Leicester